Barney Fushimi Hajiro (September 16, 1916 – January 21, 2011) was an American combat veteran of World War II who received the Medal of Honor, the highest United States military award for valor.

Biography

Early years
Hajiro was born in Hawaii, the second to the eldest of nine children born to Japanese immigrant parents His parents had moved from Hiroshima to Maui during World War I. Two of his siblings died in infancy. The family was poor, and Hajiro left school to work, first in the sugarcane fields of Maui and later as a stevedore in Honolulu.

U.S. Army

World War II

Two months after the Japanese attack on Pearl Harbor, he was drafted into the U.S. Army and performed menial labor as part of an engineering battalion.

In March 1943, Hajiro volunteered to be part of the Army's all-Nisei 442nd Regimental Combat Team.   The 442nd was mostly made up of second-generation Americans citizens of Japanese descent from Hawaii and the mainland. The unit was sent to Europe and in May 1944 fought the Germans in Italy, north of Rome. From there the 442nd was redeployed to France.

On October 19, 1944, the 442nd was fighting near Bruyères and Biffontaine in eastern France and over the next ten days, Hajiro, a private in Company I, repeatedly distinguished himself in battle. He exposed himself to enemy fire while assisting an Allied attack on October 19, and three days later he and a comrade ambushed an 18-man enemy patrol. On October 29, during the rescue of the so-called "Lost Battalion", which had been surrounded by German forces in the Vosges Mountains, he single-handedly destroyed two German machine gun emplacements. Afterwards, in another firefight, he was shot in the shoulder and wrist leaving his left arm partially paralyzed. He was able to rejoin the 442nd in Monte Carlo, but was barred from further combat duty. He was then sent back to the United States to recover.

Hajiro was recommended for the Medal of Honor for his actions in October 1944. He received the Distinguished Service Cross and the World War II Victory Medal before he was honorably discharged.

Post-war and later years
In 1948, he was awarded the Military Medal by the British government. A 1990s review of U.S. military service records for personnel of Asian descent who had received the Distinguished Service Cross during World War II led to Hajiro's Distinguished Service Cross being upgraded to the Medal of Honor. President Bill Clinton presented Hajiro the Medal of Honor during a ceremony at the White House on June 21, 2000. Twenty-one other former U.S. military personnel of Asian descent also received the Medal of Honor during the ceremony, fifteen of them posthumously. In 2004, the French awarded Hajiro the Legion of Honor.

Death
Hajiro was the oldest living WWII Medal of Honor recipient for seven months. He died on January 21, 2011, in Waipahu, Hawaii.

Military decorations and awards
Hajiro's military awards include:
  Medal of Honor
  Bronze Star Medal
  Purple Heart
  Army Presidential Unit Citation
  Army Good Conduct Medal
  American Campaign Medal
  European-African-Middle Eastern Campaign Medal
  World War II Victory Medal
  British Military Medal 
  French Legion of Honor
  French Liberation Medal
  Combat Infantryman Badge

Medal of Honor citation 
Hajiro's official Medal of Honor citation reads:
Citation: For conspicuous gallantry and intrepidity at risk of his life above and beyond the call of duty. Private Barney F. Hajiro distinguished himself by extraordinary heroism in action on 19, 22, and October 29, 1944, in the vicinity of Bruyeres and Biffontaine, eastern France. Private Hajiro, while acting as a sentry on top of an embankment on October 19, 1944, in the vicinity of Bruyeres, France, rendered assistance to allied troops attacking a house 200 yards away by exposing himself to enemy fire and directing fire at an enemy strong point. He assisted the unit on his right by firing his automatic rifle and killing or wounding two enemy snipers. On October 22, 1944, he and one comrade took up an outpost security position about 50 yards to the right front of their platoon, concealed themselves, and ambushed an 18-man, heavily armed, enemy patrol, killing two, wounding one, and taking the remainder as prisoners. On October 29, 1944, in a wooded area in the vicinity of Biffontaine, France, Private Hajiro initiated an attack up the slope of a hill referred to as "Suicide Hill" by running forward approximately 100 yards under fire. He then advanced ahead of his comrades about 10 yards, drawing fire and spotting camouflaged machine gun nests. He fearlessly met fire with fire and single-handedly destroyed two machine gun nests and killed two enemy snipers. As a result of Private Hajiro's heroic actions, the attack was successful. Private Hajiro's extraordinary heroism and devotion to duty are in keeping with the highest traditions of military service and reflect great credit upon him, his unit, and the United States Army.

See also
 List of Asian American Medal of Honor recipients
 List of Medal of Honor recipients for World War II

References

External links

 "Army Secretary Lionizes 22 World War II Heroes" at Defense.gov
 

1916 births
2011 deaths
American military personnel of Japanese descent
United States Army personnel of World War II
Recipients of the Legion of Honour
People from Maui
Recipients of the Distinguished Service Cross (United States)
Recipients of the Military Medal
United States Army Medal of Honor recipients
United States Army soldiers
World War II recipients of the Medal of Honor
Burials in the National Memorial Cemetery of the Pacific